Streptomyces hygroscopicus is a bacterial species in the genus Streptomyces. It was first described by Hans Laurits Jensen in 1931.

Biochemistry 
Cultures of different strains of S. hygroscopicus can be used to produce a number of chemical compounds or enzymes.

Small molecules

Immunosuppressants 
Sirolimus (also known as rapamycin) is an immunosuppressant that has been isolated from S. hygroscopicus from soil samples from Easter Island. Ascomycin can be used to treat autoimmune diseases and skin diseases, and can help prevent rejection after an organ transplant.

Antibiotics 
The antibiotics geldanamycin, hygromycin B, nigericin, validamycin, and cyclothiazomycin are found in S. hygroscopicus.

Experimental cancer drugs 
Indolocarbazoles can be found in S. hygroscopicus .

Anthelmintics and insecticides 
Milbemycin and milbemycin oxime can be found in S. hygroscopicus cultures.

Herbicide 
S. hygroscopicus also produces the natural herbicide bialaphos.

Enzymes 
The enzymes alpha,alpha-trehalose-phosphate synthase (GDP-forming), carboxyvinyl-carboxyphosphonate phosphorylmutase and hygromycin-B kinase can be isolated from cultures of S. hygroscopicus.

References

External links 

Type strain of Streptomyces hygroscopicus at BacDive -  the Bacterial Diversity Metadatabase

hygroscopicus
Bacteria described in 1931